The Paris Mounties are a junior hockey team based in Paris, Ontario, Canada. They were members of the Midwestern Junior C Hockey League of the Ontario Hockey Association until the 2016-17 season when it became the Pat Dougherty Division of the Central Conference of the Provincial Junior Hockey League.

History
The Mounties came about in the wake of the folding of the Intermediate "B" Paris '29ers.

After twenty-one seasons in the Niagara & District Junior C Hockey League, the Ontario Hockey Association realigned and they were placed in the Midwestern Junior C Hockey League.

Summer of 2016 the eight junior "C" hockey leagues in Southern Ontario amalgamated into a single Provincial Junior Hockey League with the individual leagues becoming divisions.  The Midwestern Junior league re-branded to the Pat Doherty Division.

The playoffs for the 2019-20 season were cancelled due to the COVID-19 pandemic, leading to the team not being able to play a single game.

Season-by-season record
Note: GP = Games Played, W = Wins, L = Losses, T = Ties, OTL = Overtime Losses, GF = Goals for, GA = Goals against

Clarence Schmalz Cup appearances
1996: Paris Mounties defeated Napanee Raiders 4-games-to-1

External links
Paris Mounties official website

Niagara Junior C Hockey League teams